Valori plastici (meaning Plastic Values in English) was an Italian magazine published in Rome in Italian and French. The magazines existed between 1918 and 1921.

History and profile
Valori plastici was established in Rome by the painter and art collector Mario Broglio and his wife Edita Broglio in 1918. He also edited the magazine which focused on aesthetic ideals and metaphysical artwork. It supported the art movement Return to order so as to create a change of direction from the extreme avant-garde art of the years up to 1918, taking its inspiration from traditional art instead.

The term "return to order" to describe this renewed interest in tradition is said to derive from Le rappel a l'ordre, a book of essays by the poet and artist Jean Cocteau published in 1926. The movement itself  was a reaction to the War.  Cubism was abandoned even by its creators, Braque and Picasso, and Futurism, which had praised machinery, violence and war, was rejected by most of its followers.  The return to order was associated with a revival of classicism and realistic painting.

The magazine theorised the retrieval of national and Italic values, as promoted by the cultural policies of fascism, but also looking at wider horizons within Europe and using a vivid artistic dialectics with a return to a classic figurative source.

Alberto Savinio, in the 1st issue of Valori plastici on 15 November 1918, announced a programme of total individualistic, anti-futurist and anti-Bolshevik restoration. In his first article of April–May 1919, entitled Anadioménon, Savinio expounds the intellective and enigmatically atemporal intuition which animates the world of this new "metaphysical classicism".

See also
 List of magazines in Italy
Return to order
Scuola Romana
Novecento Italiano
Corrente di Vita
Decadent movement

Notes

Bibliography
Italy's Radical Return to Order, on The New York Times (26 December 1998)
 Il Ritorno all'Ordine, on Fotoartearchitettura.it, article by P. Campanella (2010)
 F. Negri Arnoldi, Storia dell'arte, Fratelli Fabbri, Milan (1989)
 R. De Fusco, Storia dell'arte contemporanea, Laterza, Bari (1983)
 G.C. Argan, L'arte moderna, Sansoni, Florence (1970)

External links
Tate Gallery
International Herald Tribune
 Approfondimento, su Scuolaromana.it. Retrieved 29 May 2011
 Voce Glossario, su Babelearte.it. Retrieved  29 May 2011
 Da Valori Plastici a Corrente, su Italica Rai. Retrieved  29 May 2011
The Essence of Magic Realism - Critical Study of the origins and development of Magic Realism in art.

1918 establishments in Italy
1921 disestablishments in Italy
Avant-garde magazines
Cultural magazines
Defunct magazines published in Italy
French-language magazines
Italian-language magazines
Magazines established in 1918
Magazines disestablished in 1921
Magazines published in Rome
Visual arts magazines